Maurício Ferreira de Souza (born 13 March 1974), known as Maurício Souza, is a Brazilian professional football manager and former football and futsal player.

Career
Born in Rio de Janeiro, Souza was known as Maurício during his playing days, and was an America-RJ youth graduate. After three years in the main squad, he switched to futsal and played the remainder of his career in the sport.

Souza's first managerial role back in football occurred in 2010, after Botafogo established a partnership with his futsal side Casa d'España; he was appointed in charge of the youth teams. In 2014, already in charge of the under-20s, he became Eduardo Hungaro's assistant in the main squad.

On 25 February 2016, Souza was dismissed at Bota. Shortly after he joined Flamengo; initially a coordinator of the futsal squad of the club, he took over the under-17 side in 2017.

Promoted to the under-20 squad in the end of 2017, Souza was also an assistant manager of Maurício Barbieri and Dorival Júnior in the main squad during the 2018 campaign; he was also an interim manager during two Copa Libertadores matches, as Barbieri was suspended. He was also in charge of the main squad for the four first matches of the 2020 Campeonato Carioca, as manager Jorge Jesus and the entire first-team squad was given an extended holiday period.

Souza was named interim manager of Fla on 9 November 2020, after the dismissal of Domènec Torrent, but his spell only lasted one day as the club signed Rogério Ceni. He was also an interim when Ceni was sacked in July 2021, and was named at the same role until the end of the season on 29 November 2021, after Renato Gaúcho was dismissed.

Souza was fired by Flamengo on 10 January 2022, and moved to Athletico Paranaense roughly one month later, also as an assistant manager. He left the latter club after the departure of Alberto Valentim in April.

On 13 June 2022, Souza was named manager of Série B side Vasco da Gama. He was sacked on 24 July, after just eight matches.

References

External links

1974 births
Living people
Footballers from Rio de Janeiro (city)
Brazilian footballers
Brazilian football managers
Campeonato Brasileiro Série A managers
Campeonato Brasileiro Série B managers
Association football midfielders
America Football Club (RJ) players
CR Flamengo managers
CR Vasco da Gama managers